Rances Barthelemy (born 25 June 1986) is a Cuban professional boxer. He is a former two-weight world champion, having held the IBF junior lightweight title in 2014, and the IBF lightweight title from 2015 to 2016.

Amateur career

Barthelemy was a standout amateur, competing in more than 200 fights and winning a Cuban junior national championship.

Barthelemy defected to the United States prior to the 2008 Summer Olympics. He left Cuba over frustration with how his brother Yan’s career was developing and the implications that it could have for his own future in the sport.

Professional career

Barthelemy defeated Arash Usmanee on 4 January 2013 by a controversial twelve-round unanimous decision which many observers thought Usmanee had won and became the #2 contender for the IBF junior lightweight title. Barthelemy would later become the #1 contender by defeating Fahsai Sakkreerin on 21 June 2013 by second-round knockout.

Barthelemy originally defeated Argenis Mendez on 3 January 2014 to win the title, but the win was considered controversial, as Barthelemy knocked Mendez out seconds after the bell to signal the end of the second round came. Mendez and his team filled an appeal to the Minnesota Combative Sports Commission and IBF shortly after the fight, and after the appeal was successful on 30 January 2014, the result was changed to a no decision and Mendez was reinstated as the IBF junior lightweight champion. Barthelemy later defeated Mendez in a rematch on 10 July 2014 via unanimous decision to win the title. He vacated his title in February 2015 in anticipation of moving up in weight category.

In his next contest, fighting in the super lightweight division against Antonio DeMarco at the MGM Grand Garden Arena in Las Vegas, Nevada, on 21 June 2015, Barthelemy gained a convincing victory. Barthelemy showed his versatility early, coming out orthodox before switching up to southpaw midway throughout the first round. Barthelemy scored a knockdown with a huge left in the fourth round, but DeMarco survived the round. Barthelemy lost a point in the ninth round for excessive low blows, but it wasn’t enough to affect the outcome as he won 99–89 on all three cards.

On 20 May, 2017, Barthelemy fought Kiryl Relikh in a WBA eliminator. Both fighters exchanged knockdowns in the fight, The judges scored the fight in favor of Barthelemy, 117-109, 116-110 and 115-111 the decision was seen as controversial. Shortly after the fight, the WBA ordered a rematch.

In the rematch, Relikh managed to get his revenge, clearly being the better man on the night, and getting the unanimous decision victory, while also winning the vacant WBA super lightweight title.

On 27 April, 2019, Barthelemy fought Robert Easter Jr for the vacant WBA interim super lightweight title. In a very uneventful match, neither fighter looked like they deserve the win. The judges scored the fight as a split-draw, leaving both fighter without the secondary WBA belt.

Professional boxing record

See also
List of super-featherweight boxing champions
List of lightweight boxing champions

References

External links

Rances Barthelemy - Profile, News Archive & Current Rankings at Box.Live

1986 births
Living people
Super-featherweight boxers
Lightweight boxers
Light-welterweight boxers
World super-featherweight boxing champions
World lightweight boxing champions
International Boxing Federation champions
Boxers from Havana
Cuban male boxers
Defecting sportspeople of Cuba